In theoretical physics, Eugene Wigner and Erdal İnönü have discussed the possibility to obtain from a given Lie group a different (non-isomorphic) Lie group by a group contraction with respect to a continuous subgroup of it. That amounts to a limiting operation on a parameter of the Lie algebra, altering the structure constants of this Lie algebra in a nontrivial singular manner, under suitable circumstances.

 .

The contraction limit  trivializes the first commutator and thus yields the non-isomorphic algebra of the plane Euclidean group, . (This is isomorphic to the cylindrical group, describing motions of a point on the surface of a cylinder. It is the little group, or stabilizer subgroup, of null four-vectors in Minkowski space.) Group extension), the parabolic Lorentz transformations.

Similar limits, of considerable application in physics (cf. Correspondence principles),  contract
 the de Sitter group  to the Poincaré group , as the de Sitter radius diverges: ; or
 the Poincaré group to the Galilei group, as the speed of light diverges: ; or
 the Moyal bracket Lie algebra (equivalent to quantum commutators) to the Poisson bracket Lie algebra, in the classical limit as the Planck constant vanishes: .

Notes

References 
 
 
 
 
 

Lie algebras
Lie groups
Mathematical physics